Broad Cove  is a community in the Canadian province of Nova Scotia, located in the Lunenburg Municipal District in Lunenburg County.

The community thrives on tourism, especially in the peak summer months.
The community is served by a town hall where regular community events are held.

References
Broad Cove on Destination Nova Scotia

Communities in Lunenburg County, Nova Scotia
General Service Areas in Nova Scotia